Oncideres miniata is a species of beetle in the family Cerambycidae. It was described by James Thomson in 1868. It is known from Paraguay, Argentina and Brazil.

References

miniata
Beetles described in 1868